Recurvaria taphiopis is a moth of the family Gelechiidae. It is found in North America, where it has been recorded from Ontario.

The wingspan is 11–12 mm. The forewings are grey closely and suffusedly irrorated dark fuscous, less so towards the base and dorsum. There are three black subdorsal tufts, a more or less developed band of white irroration extending from the costa at one-third to between the first two tufts, a small white spot on the apex of the third first discal stigma which is moderate and blackish. There is also a small white spot on the tornus, and one less marked on the costa somewhat before it. Some indistinct blackish marginal dots are found around the apical area, as well as some whitish irroration. The hindwings are grey.

References

Moths described in 1929
Recurvaria
Moths of North America